The General Dynamics F-16XL is a derivative of the F-16 Fighting Falcon with a cranked-arrow delta wing. It entered the United States Air Force's (USAF) Enhanced Tactical Fighter (ETF) competition but lost to the F-15E Strike Eagle. Several years after the prototypes were shelved, they were turned over to NASA for additional aeronautical research. Both aircraft are currently stored at Edwards Air Force Base.

Development

SCAMP

Several alternative wing designs were considered, but the large "cranked-arrow" wing (similar to that of the Saab 35 Draken) was pursued due to its much more efficient lift-to-drag ratio at supersonic speeds. 

The company worked closely with NASA's Langley Research Center and invested significant R&D funds for wind tunnel testing. Over several years the design was refined which led to the final  design by late 1980.

Enhanced Tactical Fighter competition

In 1980, the USAF signed on as a partner, providing the third and fifth production  airframes for conversion.

In March 1981, the USAF announced the Enhanced Tactical Fighter (ETF) program to procure a replacement for the F-111 Aardvark. The concept envisioned an aircraft capable of launching deep interdiction missions without requiring additional support in the form of fighter escorts or jamming support. General Dynamics submitted the  while McDonnell Douglas submitted a variant of the F-15 Eagle. Though the two aircraft were competing for the same role, they had fairly different design approaches. The  required very few alterations from its base , while the  had major structural and aerodynamic differences from the original . As such, the  would have required much more effort, time, and money to put into full production. Additionally, the  had two engines, which gave it a much higher maximum takeoff weight and redundancy in the case of engine failure.

In February 1984, the USAF awarded the ETF contract to McDonnell Douglas. The two  were returned to the Air Force and placed in storage at Edwards Air Force Base. Had General Dynamics won the competition, the  would have gone into production as the F-16E/F (E for single seat, F for two seats).

Design

The wing and rear horizontal control surfaces of the base  were replaced with a cranked-arrow delta wing 115% larger than the original wing.

With the new wing design, the tail section had to be canted up 3.16°, and the ventral fins removed, to prevent them from striking the pavement during takeoff and landing. The  also received a larger inlet which would go on to be included in later  variants.

These changes resulted in a 25% improvement in lift-to-drag ratio in supersonic flight while remaining comparable in subsonic flight, and a plane that reportedly handled smoothly at high speeds and low altitudes. The enlarged wing and strengthened hardpoints allowed for a highly configurable payload:

 16x  wing hardpoints
 5x  wing hardpoints
 4x semi-recessed AIM-120 AMRAAM stations under fuselage
 2x wingtip stations
 1x centerline station
 2x wing "heavy/wet" stations
 2x chin LANTIRN stations

NASA testing

In 1988, the two aircraft were taken out of storage and turned over to NASA Ames-Dryden Flight Research Facility for supersonic laminar flow research for the High Speed Civil Transport (HSCT) program. The F-16XL was considered ideal for these tests because of its cranked-arrow wing and high-speed, high-altitude capabilities. The tests were carried out by a NASA and industry team and intended to achieve laminar flow over the wings, validate computational fluid dynamics (CFD) design methodology, and test active suction systems. These tests involved the installation of either passive or active suction aerodynamic gloves. The active suction glove was intended to suck away turbulent airflow over the wings during supersonic flight, restoring laminar flow and reducing drag. The NASA Langley Research Center developed and coordinated  experiments.

 was fitted with an active suction glove encasing the left wing. Designed and built by North American Aviation, it had laser-cut holes that were nominally  diameter at a uniform  spacing. The suction was provided by a Convair 880 air-conditioning turbocompressor where the 20mm cannon's ammunition had been. Overall,  completed 31 test flights for these tests from May 1990 to September 1992. Afterwards, it was used to test takeoff performance, engine noise, and sonic boom phenomena.

 had its engine replaced with the more powerful General Electric F110-129. It was mounted with a passive glove on the right wing and an active suction glove on the left wing. The passive glove was fitted with instruments to measure the flow characteristics over the wing. Suction was provided by a cabin-air pressurization turbocompressor from a Boeing 707, installed where the 20mm ammunition drum had been, which exhausted above the right wing. Overall,  performed 45 test flights from October 1995 to November 1996.

While “significant progress" was made towards achieving laminar flow at supersonic speeds, neither aircraft achieved the requisite laminar flow characteristics at intended speeds and altitudes. Nonetheless, NASA officials considered the test program to have been successful. NASA briefly investigated using a Tupolev Tu-144 which would more closely resemble the high-speed civil transport aircraft to continue supersonic laminar flow research, but did not pursue the idea due to a limited budget.

At the conclusion of their test programs in 1999, both  were placed into storage at NASA Dryden. In 2007, Boeing and NASA studied the feasibility of returning  to flight status and upgrading it with many of the improvements found in the USAF's  in order to further test sonic boom mitigation technology.  was taxi tested at Dryden and given systems checks. However, both  were retired in 2009 and stored at Edwards AFB.

Aircraft on Display
F-16XL
 75-0747 – Museum Air Park, Air Force Flight Center Museum, Edwards AFB, California.
 75-0749 – in storage at the Air Force Flight Center Museum, Edwards AFB, California.

Specifications (F-16XL number 2)

See also

References

Citations

Notes

Bibliography

External links

 , photo gallery number 2
 .
 .
 .
 .
 
 

Tailless delta-wing aircraft
F-16XL
NASA aircraft
General Dynamics F-16XL
Single-engined jet aircraft
Relaxed-stability aircraft
Aircraft first flown in 1982